Decatur High School is a comprehensive public high school located in the rural, distant community of Decatur, Arkansas, United States. The school provides secondary education for students in grades 7 through 12. It is one of nine public high schools in Benton County, Arkansas and the sole high school administered by the Decatur School District.

In addition to Decatur, the district includes small sections of Centerton and Highfill.

Academics 
Decatur High School is accredited by the Arkansas Department of Education (ADE) and the assumed course of study follows the Smart Core curriculum developed by the ADE, which requires students complete at least 22 units prior to graduation. Students complete regular coursework and exams and may take Advanced Placement (AP) courses and exam with the opportunity to receive college credit.

Athletics 
The Decatur High School mascot and athletic emblem is the bulldog with blue and gold serving as the school colors.

The Decatur Bulldogs compete in interscholastic activities within the 2A Classification—the state's second smallest classification—via the 2A Region 4 Conference (football) and 2A Region 4 West Conference (basketball), as administered by the Arkansas Activities Association. The Bulldogs field teams in football, cross country (boys/girls), tennis (boys/girls), basketball (boys/girls), soccer (boys/girls), track and field (boys/girls), baseball, softball, and cheer.

References

External links 
 

Public high schools in Arkansas
Schools in Benton County, Arkansas
Decatur, Arkansas